Houssem Chemali (born 26 June 1991) is an Algerian footballer who plays as a midfielder for Namur.

Personal life
Chemali was born on 26 June 1991, in Bordj Bou Arréridj. At age 12, he moved with his family to France.

Career
Chemali began his career in the junior ranks of Montrouge FC. In 2004, at age 13, Chemali was selected to join the INF Clairefontaine academy, where he would spend the next three years. At the end of his development at Clairefontaine, he joined Guingamp.

On 30 July 2009, he was signed by Monza.

References

External links
 Football.it Profile 
 
 

1991 births
Algerian expatriates in Italy
Algerian footballers
Algerian emigrants to France
A.C. Monza players
Association football midfielders
Expatriate footballers in Italy
INF Clairefontaine players
Living people
Algerian expatriate sportspeople in Italy
Algerian expatriate footballers